The Onaping Falls Huskies were a Junior "A" ice hockey team from Onaping Falls, Ontario, Canada.  This defunct hockey team was a part of the Northern Ontario Junior Hockey League (NOJHL).

History
As the Levack Miners, the team won the 1972 NOHA Jr. B League.  In 1974, they changed their name to the Onaping Falls Huskies and won four consecutive NOHA Jr. B League titles (1975, 1976, 1977, and 1978) and three branch titles (1975, 1976, and 1978).  They, and their league, were promoted to Jr. A in the summer of 1978.

Playing exclusively in the NOJHL from 1978 to 1986, the Onaping Falls Huskies were a very successful team, winning four league titles in their seven seasons.  They won the McNamara Cup in 1980, 1981, 1982, and 1986.  At the national level, they were never able to defeat the champions of the Ontario Provincial Junior A Hockey League, however, and therefore never advanced to compete for the Dudley Hewitt Cup.

In 1980, the Huskies were swept by the North York Rangers 3-games-to-none.  In 1981, they were swept by the Belleville Bulls 3-games-to-none.  And in 1982, the Huskies were swept by the Guelph Platers 3-games-to-none.  Both Belleville and Guelph were granted expansion into the Ontario Hockey League soon after these playoff runs.  In 1986, the Huskies faced the dominant Orillia Travelways and lost 4-games-to-2.

Season-by-season results

Defunct ice hockey teams in Canada
Sports teams in Greater Sudbury
Northern Ontario Junior Hockey League teams
Ice hockey clubs established in 1970
1970 establishments in Ontario
Sports clubs disestablished in 1986
1986 disestablishments in Ontario